Kuwait competed at the 1980 Summer Paralympics in Arnhem, Netherlands. 9 competitors from Kuwait won 5 medals including 2 gold, 2 silver and 1 bronze and finished joint 26th in the medal table with South Korea.

See also 
 Kuwait at the Paralympics
 Kuwait at the 1980 Summer Olympics

References 

Kuwait at the Paralympics
1980 in Kuwaiti sport
Nations at the 1980 Summer Paralympics